Troy Milton Pinder (born 30 October 1997) is a Bahamian footballer who plays for Western Warriors SC and the Bahamian national football team.

International career
In May 2018, Pinder was called up for CONCACAF Nations League qualifying matches against Belize, Antigua and Barbuda, and Anguilla. Pinder made his senior international debut on 7 September 2018, playing all ninety minutes of a 4-0 away defeat to Belize.

References

External links

1997 births
Living people
Bahamian footballers
Bahamas international footballers
Association football defenders